Chehel Dokhtaran (also Romanized as Chehel Dokhtarān) is a village in Rezqabad Rural District, in the Central District of Esfarayen County, North Khorasan Province, Iran. At the 2006 census, its population was 202, in 43 families. The village's name means forty girls in Persian.

References 

Populated places in Esfarayen County